GigaSpaces Technologies Inc., is a privately held software company, established in 2000, with its headquarters located in New York City, and additional offices in Europe, Asia, and Israel.

History

GigaSpaces was founded in 2000 by Nati Shalom. Initially it focused on distributed computing for extreme transaction processing with its XAP product (eXtreme Application Platform). In February 2012 it launched an open source platform as a service called Cloudify. In September 2016 GigaSpaces launched InsightEdge, a data grid-enabled real-time analytics platform. In July 2017, GigaSpaces announced spinoff of the Cloudify division to focus on enterprise hybrid cloud management and network orchestration. In March 2019, GigaSpaces announced InsightEdge Data Lake Accelerator, AnalyticsXtreme, for faster, smarter, real-time analytics. In February 2020, GigaSpaces Launched GigaSpaces Cloud, a Managed Service on Google Cloud Platform.

In 2021 GigaSpaces unveiled its flagship product: Smart Digital Integration Hub (DIH), a middleware that enables to decouple digital applications from their respective systems of record that feed these applications with data, to simplify and expedite the process of building new digital services and accelerating digital transformations.

In May 2020, GigaSpaces announced $12 million financing led by Fortissimo Capital.

In November 2021, GigaSpaces announced a $13.5 million funding round led by Leumi Partners (https://www.calcalistech.com/ctech/articles/0,7340,L-3922191,00.html).

Exposure Layer 
The exposure layer can either abstract the data store by providing access to data services via a standardized API (e.g. REST, SOAP etc.) or allow direct data access via client SDK (Java, .Net, Python) or via SQL API (JDBC, ODBC).

References

External References

Companies based in New York City
Software companies of Israel
Companies established in 2000
Cloud computing providers